McLaren Health Care Corporation is an integrated, managed care health care organization in the Lower Peninsula of Michigan.  McLaren operates 14 hospitals, ambulatory surgery centers, imaging centers, a primary and specialty care physician network, commercial and Medicaid HMOs, home health and hospice providers, retail medical equipment showrooms, pharmacy services, and a wholly owned medical malpractice insurance company. McLaren also operates Michigan's largest network of cancer centers and providers, anchored by the Barbara Ann Karmanos Cancer Institute. The Karmanos Cancer Center is the only National Cancer Institute (NCI)-designated comprehensive cancer center in metro Detroit. Its headquarters is in Grand Blanc, Michigan with operations facilities in Michigan, Ohio, and Indiana.

Hospitals

References

External links
McLaren Health Care Corporation website

Companies based in Genesee County, Michigan
Hospital networks in the United States
Economy of Flint, Michigan
Medical and health organizations based in Michigan